North Manchester Planing and Band Saw Mill (J.A. Browne Co. Mill) was a historic sawmill complex located at North Manchester, Wabash County, Indiana.  The sawmill was built in 1876, and was a -story brick building. It was enlarged in 1898, to house the power station of the Browne-Mills Electric Company.  Associated with the mill were three brick cottages built in the late-1870s for mill employees.

It was listed on the National Register of Historic Places in 1982, and delisted in 1995.

References

Former National Register of Historic Places in Indiana
Industrial buildings and structures on the National Register of Historic Places in Indiana
Industrial buildings completed in 1876
Buildings and structures in Wabash County, Indiana
National Register of Historic Places in Wabash County, Indiana
1876 establishments in Indiana